Łukasz Pieniążek (born 19 September 1990) is a Polish rally driver. Currently, He drives for M-Sport Ford in the WRC-2 Pro category.

Rally career

Pieniążek made his WRC debut at 2016 Rally de Portugal, driving a Citroën DS3 R3T Max in the WRC-3 and J-WRC categories. One year later, he was promoted to the WRC-2 category.

At 2018 Rally de Portugal, he scored his first WRC points, finishing ninth in the overall standings. The rally was also his first-ever podium finish in the WRC-2 championship.

On January 10, 2019, it was confirmed by M-Sport Ford that Pieniążek would contest for selected events in the newly-created WRC-2 Pro championship. In Guanajuato and Corsica, he won the Pro class.

Rally victories

WRC-2 Pro victories

Rally results

WRC results
 
* Season still in progress.

WRC-2 Pro results
 
* Season still in progress.

References

External links

 
Łukasz Pieniążek's WRC profile
Łukasz Pieniążek's e-wrc profile

1990 births
Living people
Polish rally drivers
World Rally Championship drivers
M-Sport drivers